York Suburban High School is a Middle-States accredited, comprehensive four-year high school with an enrollment of 850 students located in Spring Garden Township in the U.S. state of Pennsylvania.

History
York Suburban opened its doors in September 1958 as a school housing approximately 1250 students in grades 7-12. At the time, there were 53 instructors on a team of 61 professionals. Later, the school was modified to accommodate only grades 9-12, as it does today.

Curriculum
Students may select from 150 courses to fill a ten-period day (7:55 - 2:55) on a six-day cycle. Offerings in English, social studies, science, mathematics and foreign languages (4) are year-long courses taught at the General, College Preparatory (CP), and Honors courses. Some classes are also available at the AP level. Full year courses are awarded 1.0 credits; semester courses, 0.5. 4 years of English, 3 years of Science, Social Studies, and Mathematics, and 7 in electives including courses in health, driving safety, and computer applications are required.

Extracurricular activities
Twenty athletic teams compete for the Trojans of YS. The school has two synthetic turf fields made by Sprinturf which opened in 2007.  The York Suburban boys basketball team won districts for the 2008–2009 season. The boys swim team won the PIAA AA State Team Championship in 2006, 2007, and 2008. The boys cross-country team won the PIAA AA State Championships in 2009 and 2014.  The girls cross-country team completed their seasons 18-0 in both the 2008, 2009, 2010, and 2011 seasons and placed all of their top runners in the top 20 at the YAIAA championships in 2010 and 2011.  Theatre opportunities include two annual plays, one fall and one spring, drama club, annual musical and a chapter of the International Thespian Society. There is a National Honor Society, National Art Honor Society, French Honor Society, German honor society, and more recently a Spanish Honor Society. The music program includes opportunities in Marching and Concert band, Concert Choir, YS Singers, Jazz Band, String Ensemble, and Pep Band. There is an active Student Council with a membership of approximately 90 students. YS has a student newspaper. There is Project Harmony, Green Club, Science Olympiad, and SADD.

1969 Marching Band
The York Suburban Marching Band had the privilege of performing the Star Spangled Banner before Game 2 of the 1969 World Series, between the Baltimore Orioles and the New York Mets.  The game ended with the Mets winning 2-1.

Notable alumni
Steve Hoffman, former NFL coach
Ken Ludwig, playwright and theatre director
DeWolfe Miller III, Vice admiral and Commander, Naval Air Forces
Todd Platts, attorney and Republican Party politician
Evan Sharp, co-founder of Pinterest
Craig Sheffer, film and television actor
Nathan Keyes, film and television actor

References

External links
Official site

High schools in Central Pennsylvania
Educational institutions established in 1958
Schools in York County, Pennsylvania
Public high schools in Pennsylvania
1958 establishments in Pennsylvania